John Wingfield may refer to:

John Wingfield (before 1585–1596), English soldier.
John Wingfield (MP) (1560–1626), English politician
John Wingfield (priest) (1915–1983), English Anglican Archdeacon of Bodmin
John David Wingfield (1916–1942), United States Naval Reserve 
Harry Wingfield (John Henry Wingfield, 1910–2002), English illustrator
John Henry Ducachet Wingfield (1833–1898), first bishop of the Episcopal Diocese of Northern California (1874–1898)

See also
John de Wingfield, 14th-century Chief of Staff to Edward, the Black Prince
John Wingfield Malcolm, 1st Baron Malcolm (1833–1902), British politician